CompCert is a formally verified optimizing compiler for a large subset of the C99 programming language (known as Clight) which currently targets PowerPC, ARM, RISC-V, x86 and x86-64 architectures. This project, led by Xavier Leroy, started officially in 2005, funded by the French institutes ANR and INRIA. The compiler is specified, programmed and proven in Coq. It aims to be used for programming embedded systems requiring reliability. The performance of its generated code is often close to that of GCC (version 3) at optimization level -O1, and always better than that of GCC without optimizations.

Since 2015 AbsInt offers commercial licenses, provides support and maintenance, and contributes to the advancement of the tool. CompCert is released under a noncommercial license, and is therefore not free software, although some of its source files are dual-licensed with the GNU Lesser General Public License version 2.1 or later or are available under the terms of other licenses.

For the development of CompCert, the first practically useful optimizing compiler targeting multiple commercial architectures that has a complete, mechanically checked proof of its correctness, Xavier Leroy and the development team of CompCert received the 2021 ACM Software System Award.

References

External links
 
 
 Formal verification of a realistic compiler
 Software System Award — ACM Awards

Compilers
Formal methods
Logic in computer science